United Nations Security Council resolution 844, adopted unanimously on 18 June 1993, after reaffirming Resolution 713 (1991) and subsequent resolutions, the Council noted deteriorating situation in Bosnia and Herzegovina and authorised a reinforcement of the United Nations Protection Force (UNPROFOR).

Acting under Chapter VII of the United Nations Charter and reiterating its alarm at violations of international humanitarian law, an additional 7,600 personnel were sent to supplement UNPROFOR in accordance with a report of the Secretary-General Boutros Boutros-Ghali pursuant to Resolution 836 (1993). Further calls for additional personnel from Member States were also made, and for equipment and logistical support.

The decision to use air power in and around the safe areas of Tuzla, Žepa, Bihać, Goražde, Sarajevo and Srebrenica in order to provide assistance to UNPROFOR was reaffirmed, urging Member States to co-operate with the Secretary-General on the matter.

See also
 Bosnian War
 Breakup of Yugoslavia
 List of United Nations Security Council Resolutions 801 to 900 (1993–1994)
 Yugoslav Wars

References

External links
 
Text of the Resolution at undocs.org

 0844
 0844
1993 in Yugoslavia
1993 in Bosnia and Herzegovina
 0844
 0844
June 1993 events